Canoparmelia cassa is a species of foliose lichen in the family Parmeliaceae. This species is characteristic by the occurrence of isidia together with fatty acids. It is similar externally to Canoparmelia amazonica. Its epithet cassa is derived from the Latin cassus, meaning "devoid", due to this species' lack of medullar reactive substances.

Description
Its surface is continuous, laterally overlapping and adnate, being dichotomously ramified. The species' axillary sinus is oval, it counts with rounded apices, and a black-lined margin with no cilia. It shows no lacinules while possessing laminal maculae.

Its isidia are also laminal and cylindrical, being between 0.2 and 0.6 mm high. Its medulla is white, while its underside possesses a rugose, veined and papillate margin. Its central surface is black and also papillate. Apothecia and pycnidia are absent in Canoparmelia cassa.

Habitat

References

Further reading
Spielmann, Adriano Afonso, and Marcelo Pinto Marcelli. "Parmeliaceae (Ascomycota liquenizados) nos barrancos e peraus da encosta da Serra Geral, Vale do Rio Pardo, Rio Grande do Sul, Brasil. II. Gêneros Canoparmelia, Hypotrachyna, Myelochroa, Parmelinopsis e Relicina." Iheringia, Série Botânica63.2 (2008): 193-212.
Cunha, Iane Paula Rego, Marcelo Pinto Marcelli, and Eugênia Cristina Pereira. "Canoparmelia species sl (Parmeliaceae, lichenized ascomycetes) of the tocantinan region, Maranhão and Tocantins States, Brazil." Hoehnea 42.2 (2015): 265-272.

Parmeliaceae
Lichen species
Lichens described in 2002
Taxa named by Klaus Kalb